Greenspring Media is a publisher of Minnesota-focused publications. The company publishes two subscription magazines, Minnesota Monthly and Midwest Home, as well as custom publications including Real Food, Where Twin Cities, Twin Cities Living, Minneapolis Meeting & Planner's Guide, Bloomington-Mall of America Visitors Guide (in partnership with Bloomington Convention & Tourism Bureau and the Mall of America), Minneapolis-Saint Paul Official Visitors Guide, and Visit-TwinCities.Com.

History
The publisher was established with a single publication in 1967. In 2013, Greenspring Media Group was sold to Hour Media. Greenspring Media is located at 706 2nd Avenue South Suite #1000 in Minneapolis, Minnesota. It covers the Twin Cities (Minneapolis-St. Paul).

In 2017, Minnesota Monthly celebrated its 50th year of publication, with Midwest Home celebrating its 25th anniversary.

References

External links
Minnesota Monthly website
Midwest Home Magazine
Twin Cities Living

1946 establishments in Minnesota
Magazine publishing companies of the United States
Publishing companies established in 1967